Brian Ross (born 15 August 1967) is a Scottish football player and manager. He played for Airdrieonians, Ayr United and East Stirlingshire as a defender, then became manager of East Stirlingshire for a year. He was appointed manager in February 2001, when he was promoted after manager George Fairley left East Stirlingshire to become general manager of Clyde. Ross made several changes to the squad in the summer of 2001, particularly bringing in younger players from junior and youth clubs, but he left East Stirlingshire in February 2002.

References

External links

1967 births
Living people
Footballers from Stirling
Association football defenders
Scottish footballers
Airdrieonians F.C. (1878) players
Ayr United F.C. players
East Stirlingshire F.C. players
Scottish Football League players
Scottish football managers
East Stirlingshire F.C. managers
Scottish Football League managers